is a manga artist who debuted in Shōjo Comic Extra in 1997 with Sakura no Hanasaku Negaigoto.  She has published well over 30 short series, though her most popular are Yume Kira Dream Shoppe (published in English by Viz Media), Tenjin, Ranmaki Origami, Nighting + Night, and Almightly X 10.

Manga 
Almighty X 10
Go! Virginal Hanayuuki
My Boy My Love
Milk Crown
Milk Crown H
Milk Crown Lovers
Knighting Night
Sakura no Hana-saku Negaigoto
Tsukarete Happy?!
First Step
No Girl
Mafuyu no Miracle
Darling Smoker
M.G. Darling
Yume Kira Dream Shoppe

External links 

Aqua Mizuto official website

People from Nagoya
Living people
Manga artists from Aichi Prefecture
1973 births